Baja Prog – Live in Mexico ’99 is a live album of Polish progressive rock group Quidam, released 1999. It was recorded during the 1999 Baja Prog festival in Mexicali, Baja California, Mexico.

Track listing 
 "Przebudzenie" – 2:40
 "Głęboka rzeka" – 6:56
 "Choćbym..." – 5:52
 "Płonę / Niespełnienie" – 18:11
 "Jest taki samotny dom" – 5:18
 "Rhayader / Rhayader Goes to Town" – 9:35
 "Sanktuarium" – 10:26
 "Angels of Mine" – 5:41
 "Child in Time" – 9:27

Personnel 

 Emila Derkowska – vocal, backing vocals
 Zbyszek Florek – piano, keyboards
 Maciej Meller – guitars
 Radek Scholl – bass guitar
 Jacek Zasada – flutes
 Rafał Jermakow – drums, percussions

References 

Quidam (band) live albums
1999 live albums